Chippenham railway station is on the Great Western Main Line (GWML) in South West England, serving the town of Chippenham, Wiltshire. The Wessex Main Line diverges from the GWML to the southwest of Chippenham and runs to  via .

It is managed by Great Western Railway, which also operates all the trains that call.

Only two platforms at the station remain in use; the platform by the main entrance is now disused.

History

The main line of the Great Western Railway (GWR) was authorised in 1835, and opened in stages: the section from  westward to Chippenham opened on 31 May 1841. The final section of the line, between Chippenham and Bath, opened on 30 June 1841.

Chippenham was soon served by other lines. The Calne Railway was authorised in 1860 and opened on 3 November 1863; this company remained independent for some years, until absorbed by the GWR in 1892.

In 1858 the station was expanded and gained a goods shed and an engine shed. A railway connection was laid to Chippenham Gas Works in 1906; this connection closed in 1932. Chippenham engine shed closed in March 1964 and services on the Calne branch ended in 1965. Chippenham East and West signal boxes closed on 21 August 1966. As from 1 February 1976 the original down platform was taken out of use and services travelling west used the south side of the island platform.

Description
The original station building at Chippenham was built to Isambard Kingdom Brunel's design and opened in 1841.

Platform 1 is used for westbound Great Western Main Line services towards Bristol Temple Meads, the West Country, South Wales and is also used for Wessex Main Line services towards Southampton Central. Platform 2 is used for eastbound services towards London Paddington and Cheltenham Spa. On the disused platform there is cycle storage, a seating area and a café.

There are two footbridges at the station, although until 2016 one only carried a right of way over the railway. This bridge was replaced with a new one providing steps and lifts on both platforms, opening in January 2016. This work was funded under the Department for Transport's Access for All scheme, although the bridge required replacement as part of the project to electrify the Great Western main line, as it was too low for the overhead wires to fit underneath. The footbridge was closed for two weeks in September 2016, eight months after opening, due to drainage issues. It had also been criticised as no lift was provided to the car park to the north of the station, although provision was made for its installation in the future. In 2022, work to install the third lift began.

Beside the station is a Grade II listed K6 Red telephone box.
In the old station yard to the south of the railway (now a car park) there is a Grade II listed Brunel-designed stone built office.
In the northern station yard (also now a car park) is another Grade II listed building, partly in random stone but mainly weather-boarded on a timber frame with a pitched slate roof. It is an early weighbridge house and coal merchant's office dating from around 1840, and may have belonged to Rowland Brotherhood's engineering works. 
The Grade II* listed Chippenham viaduct, also designed by Brunel, is detailed below.

Awards
In 2004, the station received an award to recognise its safety and security. The award, which lasted for two years, followed a passenger survey which found that 98% of the passengers through Chippenham said they felt 'safe' or 'very safe' whilst on the premises. The station is monitored by 24-hour CCTV and is alarmed.

Services

Currently, these trains run every half an hour in both directions and extensions to stations further afield westbound are made regularly.

Chippenham station connects to the Wessex Main Line via Melksham.

Future

There are plans to electrify the Great Western Main Line, originally for completion by 2016, but delayed until at least 2019. , completion through Chippenham is still awaited.

Train operator Go-Op included Chippenham in its 2016 and 2019 plans for a service from the west of England to the West Midlands, via Oxford.

The Chippenham Station Hub project aims to improve the appearance of the station's forecourt and increase parking provision by building multi-storey car parks, releasing land for development. There are seven phases, with Phase 1, the refurbishment of the booking office, having been completed and Phase 2 (redevelopment of Sadler's Mead car park) being in progress as of 2020.

Engineering works 
Northwest of the station is an engineering works, established on a smaller site north of the station in 1842 by Rowland Brotherhood to support the Great Western Railway, and later supplying equipment to the worldwide rail industry. From 1894 it was home to the company which in 1935 became Westinghouse Brake and Signal, manufacturers of railway air braking and signalling equipment. Westinghouse was acquired by Hawker Siddeley in 1979, then sold to BTR in 1992. After BTR merged with Siebe to form Invensys, Westinghouse Brakes was sold in 2000 to Knorr-Bremse, who opened a new factory at Bowerhill, Melksham.

The signals business remained at Chippenham and became Westinghouse Rail Systems, within Invensys Rail Group. This business was sold to Siemens in 2013 and became part of Siemens Rail Automation. Proposals submitted in 2016 for redevelopment of the site include homes, shops and a hotel as well as business space.

Chippenham viaduct

Immediately west of the station lies the Grade II* listed Chippenham viaduct designed by Brunel and completed in 1841. The first arch, over New Road, appears to have been modelled on the Roman triumphal arch. All is surmounted by a heavy cornice and parapet. The north side is faced with Bath stone ashlar with some brick patching, while the south side is in blue brick following widening in the early 1900s. Chippenham Civic Society has placed a blue plaque on the viaduct, which it refers to as the "Western Arches".

References

Railway stations in Wiltshire
DfT Category C1 stations
Great Western Main Line
Railway stations in Great Britain opened in 1841
Railway stations served by Great Western Railway
Isambard Kingdom Brunel railway stations
Former Great Western Railway stations
Chippenham